Rodolfo Gaona Jiménez (22 January 1888 – 20 May 1975), was a Mexican torero, known as "The Caliph De León".

He was born in Lion of the Aldamas, Guanajuato City, Mexico on 22 January 1888. His parents were Roberto Gaona and Regina Jiménez.

Career

Mexico 
Gaona debuted on 1 October 1905 in the square Mexico City.

Spain 
Rodolfo Gaona Jiménez arrived in Spain in the year 1908.

On 15 July 1908, Jiménez was inaugurated in the Plaza de Toros de Las Ventas  of Madrid.

On 31 May 1908, in Tetouan of the Victories (Madrid) with bulls of Basilio Peñalver, his godfather Manuel Lara, "The Jerezano", offered him the bull "Rabanero". After several performances in Madrid the bull surrendered to Rodolfo.

Retirement 
Gaona Jiménez retired from the arena on April 12, 1924. This was during the same time as the Mexican festival in the Monumental square of bullfighting "La Condesa", Mexico City, in a magnificent afternoon in which estoqueó seven bulls.

Death 
Rodolfo Gaona died on 20 May 1975 in the City of Mexico at the age of 87.

References 

1975 deaths
People from Guanajuato
1888 births
Mexican bullfighters